The Newton County John Does are two young murder victims whose remains were discovered by mushroom foragers in Lake Village, Newton County, Indiana, on October 18, 1983. Both victims were discovered alongside two other murder victims whose bodies were identified within months of their discovery. All four were victims of the serial killer Larry Eyler.

Numerous efforts have been made to discover the identity of the Newton County John Does, including forensic facial reconstructions generated by a forensic anthropologist, depicting how each decedent may have appeared in life. The National Center for Missing and Exploited Children has also created detailed composite drawings of the decedents. Furthermore, DNA was extracted from both decedents for genetic testing against the DNA of any individual who may be related to them.

These decedents are collectively known as the Newton County John Does due to the name of the county in which their bodies were discovered. They are individually known as Adam and Brad; names given by Newton County coroner Scott McCord decades after their murders in an effort to individualize and humanize the victims.

In April 2021, Brad was identified as John Ingram Brandenburg Jr.; a Kentucky native who disappeared from Chicago in 1983. Adam remains unidentified.

Discovery

On October 18, 1983, a middle-aged couple gathering wild mushrooms discovered two partially buried human skulls alongside an oak tree close to an abandoned farmhouse in Lake Village, Indiana. The couple immediately reported their discovery to authorities.

Investigators discovered the partially decomposed bodies of four murder victims at this location. Each victim had been deceased for several months, and all four decedents had been partially buried, face upwards, with sections of the body of each victim remaining exposed above ground and loosely covered with leaves and soil, suggesting the murderer had made only rudimentary efforts to conceal each victim.

Three of these victims were buried at one side of the tree, three feet apart, with their heads facing north. The fourth decedent was buried at the other side of this tree. All four victims had been bound and stabbed more than two dozen times, and the trousers and underwear of each victim were discovered around their ankles. Furthermore, the body of one victim had been dismembered after death.

All four murders were almost immediately linked to the collective manhunt for a serial killer known as the Highway Murderer, who at the time of the discovery of these bodies was believed to have already murdered up to nineteen young males across several Midwestern States. The level of decomposition of each victim and the clothing discovered upon each body suggested several weeks or months had elapsed between each murder. One victim had worn a parka, whereas the other three victims had worn clothing suggesting they had been murdered in the spring or summer. In addition, evidence retrieved from the farmhouse would lead investigators to conclude the murderer had evidently used this location as a site to restrain and torture these victims before burying their bodies alongside the oak tree.

By December 29, 1983, two of these four murder victims had been identified via dental records as Michael Bauer and John Bartlett; both of whom had been murdered by serial killer Larry Eyler in early March 1983. The fourth victim discovered at this location (known as Brad) was identified in April 2021 as John Brandenburg Jr., whom Eyler specifically stated he had murdered in mid- to late-May 1983. The third victim found at this farmhouse (known as Adam) remains unidentified.

Perpetrator's confession
Eyler confessed to these four murders in a statement posthumously released by his attorney, Kathleen Zellner, following his death due to AIDS-related complications in March 1994 while incarcerated on death row at the Pontiac Correctional Center. His posthumous confession specifically states the two victims unidentified at the time of his death found at this abandoned farmhouse were the third and fourth victims he had murdered at this location.

According to his posthumous confession, Adam was a hitchhiker who agreed to submit to a sexual act for $75; Brad was an individual whom Eyler claimed to have been introduced to by his alleged accomplice, Robert David Little, at his Terre Haute residence. He was unaware of either of their actual identities. In addition, he is known to have disposed of any forms of identification that he would find on his victims' possession.

"Adam"

Victim A, or Adam, a black male, was the third of the four victims to be discovered at the burial site. This victim is believed to be around fifteen to eighteen years of age, although he may have been aged in his early twenties. His hair was cut short and was black, and he was most likely between five feet eight inches and six feet two inches in height. He had received several fillings in life.

The clothing worn by this decedent included a distinctive red and black belt, inscribed with the word "devil" multiple times. The buckle contained the word "jeans". A pair of jeans and pajama bottoms were found on his remains, along with a pair of boots. The boots were made in the Hush Puppies design and had metal buckles to fasten them on each side.

As with the vast majority of Eyler's murder victims, Adam was found with his trousers and underwear around his ankles.

Eyler specifically stated this murder had been committed in July 1983, and confirmed investigators' suspicions that the victim had been a hitchhiker whom he had lured into his vehicle near Indiana State Road 63 in Terre Haute, Indiana.

Investigator Scott McCord believes that Adam was likely native to the region, perhaps from Chicago or St. Louis.

Eyler's confession
In a formal confession released by Eyler's defense attorney, Kathleen Zellner, following her client's death, Eyler claimed that on a date he believed to be a Monday in early- or mid-July 1983, following several heated arguments with his boyfriend, John Dobrovolskis (whom Eyler had recently discovered to be engaging in a discreet sexual relationship with another man), Eyler had driven toward Terre Haute. While traveling upon State Road 63, he had encountered a hitchhiker whom he confirmed to be Adam and who he described as being aged in his late teens or early twenties. According to Eyler, he offered this victim seventy-five dollars to allow Eyler to bind and "perform a sexual act" upon him, to which the victim contemplated, then agreed to his proposition. After Eyler had plied the young man with vodka and ethchlorvynol, he drove him to the abandoned farmhouse in Lake Village where he had earlier murdered John Bartlett, Michael Bauer, and John Brandenburg. At this location, the victim was bound to a wooden post, blindfolded, and stabbed multiple times in his upper and lower midsection.

According to Eyler, his last words to the victim were, "Okay, make your peace with God, nigger." He had then waited four or five minutes before stabbing this individual to death. Eyler further claimed to have confessed to this murder to his alleged accomplice, Robert David Little, whom he claimed had asked him the question, "Did he grunt or did he groan?"

Eyler's confession further revealed he had intentionally buried this victim separately from the three Caucasian victims he had previously murdered at this location as he did not believe it to be "proper" to bury an African-American alongside European Americans.

John Brandenburg
John Ingram Brandenburg Jr. (formerly known as Brad) was the fourth and final murder victim discovered at the abandoned farmhouse. This victim was determined to be a white male most likely aged between seventeen and twenty-three years old. He had medium length, reddish or auburn, wavy hair, weighed between 130 and 180 pounds and was most likely between five feet eleven inches and six feet one inches in height. This decedent had also received several fillings in life and, in the years prior to his murder, had severely fractured his nose and left ankle. In addition, staining evident upon the teeth indicated he may have been a smoker.

The clothing worn by this decedent included size 30x30 brown slacks, jockey undershorts (which had been lowered to his ankles), and brown leather hiking boots described as being ankle-high with a fleece interior.

This decedent had two known tattoos on opposite sides of his right forearm—both of which were moderately preserved and recognizable. One of these tattoos depicted either a crudely inscribed Chinese character or a cross with two circular marks. This tattoo was located on the underside of the decedent's arm close to the wrist; the other was a rectangular (or possibly U-shaped) marking containing one circular mark, which was located on the other side of his forearm. The crude nature of these tattoos indicates a possibility this decedent may have served time in jail or a juvenile detention center in life.

Eyler specifically stated this murder had been committed in either mid- or late-May 1983, on a date he believed his alleged accomplice, Robert Little, had been on a sabbatical from his employment as a library science professor at the Indiana State University.

As with Adam, DNA was extracted from one of this decedent's bones in efforts to locate any individual who may be related to him whose DNA is contained within national public DNA databases. In April 2021, Brad was formally identified as a 19-year-old Kentucky native named John Brandenburg Jr., who had disappeared from Chicago in 1983. He was last seen by his family leaving their home to visit a friend.

Eyler's confession

In Eyler's posthumous confession to Brandenburg's murder he stated that, following a weekend of continual arguing with his lover, he had driven from his lover's home in Greenview, Illinois to Robert Little's Terre Haute residence, where he first encountered this victim. According to Eyler, Little confided to him he had "picked this guy up" at a location he did not divulge. He was unsure whether Brandenburg and Little had been previously acquainted, although he did observe the two had "seemed sort of familiar" with each other. Shortly thereafter, Little persuaded this individual to participate in a sexual act at the abandoned farmhouse where Eyler had earlier murdered Bartlett and Bauer upon the promise of being paid one-hundred dollars. According to Eyler, as the trio drove to this location, Little had informed this individual, "We're looking for something really far out".

At this location, the victim was blindfolded, handcuffed, and bound to a wooden post resembling a cross before Robert Little took several photographs as Eyler removed or adjusted several items of his clothing. According to Eyler, he had to struggle to remove Brandenburg's clothing as the young man "seemed to know something was wrong". He was then stabbed to death after Eyler—responding to an instruction from Little—had informed him, "Okay, make your peace with God, motherfucker."

Ongoing investigation

Theories
Given the fact Eyler's identified victims lived in either Indiana or Illinois, investigators believed the two unidentified decedents were also likely native to the Midwestern United States. Upon revealing the successful identification of Brad, investigators stated the teenager had been a Chicago native. Investigators have not discounted the possibility that the sole remaining unidentified victim discovered in Lake Village could have hailed from anywhere in the United States or Canada.

Facial reconstructions
The two victims' faces have been reconstructed several times by the National Center for Missing and Exploited Children. The facial reconstructions by the National Center for Missing and Exploited Children reportedly took approximately eighteen months to complete.

The investigation to determine the identity of the sole remaining unidentified individual is ongoing; dental records belonging to this decedent are in the possession of investigators; and his DNA is stored within national DNA databases. In July 2020, the DNA Doe Project announced renewed genetic testing efforts to identify Adam. The same website announced their efforts to identify Brad in January 2021, three months before his identification.

Interment
In October 2016, a public funeral for Adam and Brad was held in Brook, Indiana. Both decedents—plus a further unidentified decedent known as Charlene Newton Doe whose death is unrelated to these cases—were interred inside of a mausoleum in Riverside Cemetery in Brook, Indiana.

One month after the April 2021 identification of John Brandenburg, his body was buried in Rest Haven Cemetery in Corbin, Kentucky.

See also

 Cold case
 List of murdered American children
 National Center for Missing and Exploited Children
 List of unsolved murders
 The Doe Network
 Unidentified decedent

Notes

References

Cited works and further reading

External links

 2010 news article detailing ongoing efforts to identify the Newton County John Does
 DNA Doe Project article regarding the identification of "Brad"
 
 Case file pertaining to Adam at The Doe Network
 Case file pertaining to Adam at NamUs
 Eyler's formal confession to the murders of the Newton County John Does
 The belt buckle worn by Adam

Doe John Newton County
Doe John Newton County
1983 in Indiana
Doe John Newton County
Crime in Indiana
Doe John Newton County
Doe John Newton County
Doe John Newton County
Doe John Newton County
Doe John Newton County
Doe John Newton County
Newton County, Indiana
October 1983 events in the United States
Doe John Newton County
Doe John Newton County
Doe John Newton County
Torture in the United States
Doe John Newton County
Doe John Newton County
Doe John Newton County
Doe John Newton County
Unidentified murder victims in the United States